The Gurdon Jail is a historic city jail at West Joslyn and Front Streets in Gurdon, Arkansas.  The single-story brick building, which contains two cells, was built in 1907 by the co-owner of the local brick company, M.D. Lowe.  It is the only such structure in the city, and is one of a few surviving buildings from Gurdon's boom time as a lumber town in the early 20th century.

The building was listed on the National Register of Historic Places in 1989.

See also
National Register of Historic Places listings in Clark County, Arkansas

References

Jails on the National Register of Historic Places in Arkansas
Buildings and structures completed in 1907
Buildings and structures in Clark County, Arkansas
National Register of Historic Places in Clark County, Arkansas